John McHugh is the name of:
 John M. McHugh (born 1948), former U.S. representative from New York and Secretary of the Army
 John McHugh (footballer, born 1909) (1909–1966), Scottish football goalkeeper who played in the 1920s and 1930s for a number of British clubs
 John McHugh (footballer, born 1943), Scottish football player from the 1960s and 1970s, former Clyde player
 John McHugh (Medal of Honor), American Indian Wars soldier and Medal of Honor recipient, see 5th Infantry Regiment
 John McHugh (Ohio politician) (1930–2015), mayor of Toledo, Ohio
 John McHugh (Irish politician), MP in the Northern Ireland Parliament for Fermanagh and Tyrone
 John McHugh (tenor) (1912–2002), tenor from Wolverhampton, England
 John D McHugh (born 1973), Irish photojournalist and filmmaker
 John McHugh Sr. American World War II veteran